The Extraordinary African Chambers (CAE) is a tribunal established under an agreement between the African Union and Senegal to try international crimes committed in Chad from 7 June 1982 to 1 December 1990. This period corresponds to the regime of former Chadian President Hissène Habré. The Extraordinary African Chambers were opened 8 February 2013 in Dakar, Senegal. The magistrate Ciré Aly Bâ is the current administrator of the Extraordinary African Chambers in the Senegalese courts.

References

International courts and tribunals
African Union
Judiciary of Senegal